is a former Japanese judoka.

Career
The daughter of a sumo wrestler, Kondo started judo at the age of 5. Her favorite technique is Harai goshi.

In 2011, she won the gold medal in the -48 kg weight class at the World Judo Championships Cadet. In 2013, she won the gold medal in the -48 kg weight class at the Grand Slam Tokyo by defeating olympic champion Sarah Menezes and world champion Mönkhbatyn Urantsetseg. In 2014, she belonged to Mitsui Sumitomo Insurance Group after graduating from Taisei High School. She won the gold medal in the Extra-lightweight (48 kg) division at the 2014 World Judo Championships at the age of 19.

References

External links
 

1995 births
Living people
Japanese female judoka
Judoka at the 2016 Summer Olympics
Olympic judoka of Japan
Medalists at the 2016 Summer Olympics
Olympic bronze medalists for Japan
Olympic medalists in judo
Sportspeople from Nagoya
Judoka at the 2018 Asian Games
Asian Games silver medalists for Japan
Asian Games medalists in judo
Medalists at the 2018 Asian Games
21st-century Japanese women